South Carolina Highway 453 (SC 453) is a  state highway in the U.S. state of South Carolina. The highway connects Harleyville and Eutawville, via Holly Hill.

Route description
SC 453 begins at an intersection with U.S. Route 178 (US 178; West Main Street) in Harleyville, Dorchester County. It travels to the north-northeast and crosses over some railroad tracks just before an interchange with Interstate 26 (I-26). Shortly after that stretch, it enters Orangeburg County. Just before entering Bowyer, SC 453 crosses over Home Branch. In the town of Holly Hill, it travels southeast of Gilmore Park. The highway intersects US 176 (Old State Road). The two highways travel concurrently to the northwest for about three blocks. It travels to the northeast and curves to the north-northwest. It curves back to the northeast and passes Holly Hill Academy just before crossing Briner Branch. The highway continues to the northeast, through rural areas and enters Eutawville. Almost as soon as it enters town, it meets its northern terminus, an intersection with SC 45 (Branchville Highway/Eutaw Road).

Major intersections

Boyer–Eutawville truck route

South Carolina Highway 453 Truck (SC 453 Truck) is a  truck route that takes truck traffic around most of Holly Hill. It utilizes approximately half of both U.S. Route 176 Truck (US 176 Truck) and SC 310, plus a short portion of US 176 and a long portion of SC 45.

See also

References

External links

SC 453 South Carolina Hwy Index

453
Transportation in Dorchester County, South Carolina
Transportation in Orangeburg County, South Carolina